Gediz may refer to:

 Gediz, Kütahya, a district of the Kütahya Province of Turkey
 Gediz River, a river in the Aegean region of Turkey